(also written 2004 PF115) is a trans-Neptunian object (TNO). It was discovered in 2006 by M. Brown, C. Trujillo, D. Rabinowitz. The object is classified as a possible plutino.

Physical properties 

References

External links 
 Orbit simulation from NASA JPL site
 Orbital details from the IAU Minor Planets Center
 

 

175113
Discoveries by Chad Trujillo
Discoveries by David L. Rabinowitz
Discoveries by Michael E. Brown
20040807